Consuelo Tamayo Hernández (1867 — 7 February 1957), known professionally as La Tortajada, was a Spanish dancer and singer in vaudeville.

Early life

Consuelo Tamayo was born at Santa Fe, Granada. She was educated at a convent, and trained to dance and sing there, and in Madrid. At age 14, Consuelo Tamayo married Ramón Tortajada, her music teacher and agent.

Career
La Tortajada toured internationally for more than twenty years, as a popular Spanish dancing and musical act on the vaudeville circuit. She is one of the Spanish dancers credited with introducing the fandango to North American audiences. "Of all the Spanish dancers America has ever seen," commented on American newspaper writer in 1902, "she is far and away the best." 

Publicity surrounding La Tortajada focused on violence and passion, reinforcing stereotypes about the "fiery" Spanish temperament.  In North America she was billed as "The Lady of the Duels", with publicity suggesting that she was fought over in duels throughout Europe. She had a physical confrontation with a rival over the design of a costume, in 1894.

Personal life
She retired from the stage after 1913 and returned to Granada to live in Santa Fe. She was reported to be living in seclusion with her husband and son in 1926. Ramón Tortajada died in 1928. Consuelo Tamayo died in 1957, aged 90 years. There is a street named for her (Calle Consuelo Tamayo la Tortajada) in Santa Fe, Granada.

References

External links
Portrait postcard of Consuelo Tamayo Hernández, "La Tortajada", in the collection of the Royal Academy of Music.
Portrait postcard of Consuelo Tamayo Hernández, "La Tortajada", in the Colección Museística de Andalucía.

1867 births
1957 deaths
Spanish female dancers
Vaudeville performers
19th-century Spanish dancers